Subtropical Storm Alpha was the first subtropical or tropical cyclone ever observed to make landfall in mainland Portugal. The twenty-second tropical or subtropical cyclone and twenty-first named storm of the extremely active and record-breaking 2020 Atlantic hurricane season, Alpha originated from a large non-tropical low that was first monitored by the National Hurricane Center on 15 September. Initially not anticipated to transition into a tropical cyclone, the low gradually tracked south-southeastward for several days with little development. By early on 17 September, the low had separated from its frontal features and exhibited sufficient organization to be classified as a subtropical cyclone, as it approached the Iberian Peninsula, becoming a subtropical storm around that time. Alpha then made landfall just south of Figueira da Foz, Portugal during the evening of 18 September, then rapidly weakened as it moved over the mountainous terrain of Northeastern Portugal. The system degenerated into a remnant low on 19 September, when it was last noted.

At least two EF1 tornadoes were confirmed in Portugal, and one person was killed due to strong winds in Spain. Impacts from Alpha were rather minor as a subtropical cyclone, although Alpha produced some significant rainfall and gusty winds in both Portugal and Spain as a remnant low. Total damages from the storm were estimated to be greater than €20 million (US$24.2 million), with a majority of the damage occurring in Portugal.

Meteorological history

Alpha originated from a large, extratropical low-pressure area, which developed over the Northeastern Atlantic Ocean on 14 September. The low was initially very slow-moving, but began to dip southeastward and weaken by 15 September when the National Hurricane Center (NHC) first began to monitor the system for possible development into a tropical or subtropical cyclone.

The size of the low's wind field continued gradually decreasing on 16 September, as some of its frontal features gradually became less defined, although the NHC only highlighted a low (20%) chance of development at this time, operationally. Nonetheless, convection, or thunderstorm activity, became more concentrated and organized near the center of the low, and a newly formed central low soon became the dominant feature within the larger extratropical system. In post-season analysis, the NHC estimated that Alpha had developed as a subtropical storm at 06:00 UTC on 17 September, as the thunderstorm activity associated with the smaller low feature became well-organized.

After landfall, the small low-level circulation associated with Alpha began to quickly decay, as the storm moved inland, and the cyclone weakened to a subtropical depression at 0:00 UTC on 19 September. Alpha degenerated into a remnant low later that day, as it moved over the mountainous terrain of Northeastern Portugal.

Preparations and impact

In preparation for Alpha in Portugal on 18 September, orange warnings were raised by the Portuguese Institute of the Sea and Atmosphere (IPMA), due to the threat of high wind and heavy rain in the Coimbra and Leiria districts of Portugal. Winds due to Alpha caused widespread power outages, uprooted trees, and damaged dozens of vehicles. A squall line producing gusts as high as  associated with the system spawned at least two confirmed tornadoes of EF1 intensity; one near the town of Palmela, which caused no reported damage, and one in Beja, which uprooted around 100 trees and damaged 30–40 vehicles. There were some reports of minor roof damage to some structures as well, deemed to be related to the Beja tornado. High surf caused by Alpha in Carcavelos Beach caused minor coastal erosion. Winds brought down a radio tower in Leiria, where it was reported to have been damaged beyond repair. Throughout the country, there were 203 reports of trees uprooted, 174 reports of minor flooding, 88 structures damaged and 82 roads blocked by debris. Of these reports, 143 were in Leiria District and 135 were in Lisbon District. Alpha caused an estimated €20 million (US$24.2 million) in damage in Portugal before the region would later be hit by another significant storm, Windstorm Barbara, in late October.

In Spain, orange warnings were also raised by the State Meteorological Agency (AEMET) for the Spanish autonomous communities of Madrid, Extremadura, Aragon, and Catalonia as Alpha moved into Portugal late on 18 September, citing a risk of heavy rain, hail, and strong wind gusts. Yellow alerts were also issued in Castile and León and Castilla–La Mancha. Rain and windy conditions spread further inland into Spain, while the remnants moved eastward. Castilla–La Mancha's news agency reported that uprooted trees and minor floods had occurred in the community during Alpha, while several water rescues were carried out around midday of 19 September. The fast-moving cluster of thunderstorms associated with the remnants of Alpha produced  of rain in half an hour in Valencia before the remnants exited into the Mediterranean Sea. The remnants of Alpha caused a train with 25 passengers to derail in Madrid, although no one was seriously injured. A woman died in Calzadilla after the roof of a cattle shed collapsed on top of her. Alpha also caused lightning on Ons Island, which led to an isolated forest fire.

Records and distinctions

Alpha was the earliest 22nd Atlantic tropical or subtropical storm on record, surpassing the old mark of October 17, set by Hurricane Wilma in 2005. It developed at an unusually eastern longitude18.0°W; only Tropical Storm Christine in 1973 developed farther to the east, at 14.0°W. This marked the second time (along with 2005) that the main naming list had been exhausted and that the auxiliary list of Greek letters were used. In March 2021, the World Meteorological Organization announced that the Greek Alphabet would be discontinued and replaced with an auxiliary list consisting of 21 given names if the regular naming list is exhausted. Thus, the name Alpha will no longer be used again to name an Atlantic hurricane. Upon landfall, Alpha became the first recorded tropical or subtropical cyclone known to have made landfall in Portugal.  Additionally, Cyclone Ianos was approaching its first landfall in Greece at the time; this marked the first time in recorded history that two storms of subtropical or tropical nature impacted continental Europe simultaneously.

See also

 Tropical cyclones in 2020
 Other storms of the same name
 1842 Spain hurricane – only storm known to have made landfall in the Iberian Peninsula at hurricane strength
 Hurricane Leslie (2018) – long-lived Atlantic hurricane whose extratropical remnant made landfall in Portugal
 Hurricane Vince – made landfall in Spain as a tropical depression
 Hurricane Pablo – similar track and location

References

External links

 The National Hurricane Center's Advisory Archive on Subtropical Storm Alpha
 National Hurricane Center (NHC)

Tropical cyclones in 2020
2020 Atlantic hurricane season
Subtropical storms